Cynan Jones (born 1975) is a Welsh writer, who lives and works in Ceredigion. Jones published his first novel, The Long Dry, in 2006. In 2010 he published Le Cose Che Non Vogliamo Più (Things We Don't Want Anymore) in Italian. He later published three novels between 2011 and 2014. In autumn 2016, Cove became his sixth published work. His work has been translated into other languages, and his short stories have appeared in a number of anthologies and publications like Granta and New Welsh Review. The story A Glass of Cold Water aired on BBC Radio 4 in May 2014.

Jones has been noted as an author and received some awards. In October 2017, he won the £15,000 BBC National Short Story Award for The Edge of the Shoal.

Early career
Jones was born near Aberaeron, Ceredigion. The Long Dry, his first novel, was awarded a 2007 Betty Trask Award. In 2008, the author himself was named as the Hay Festival Scritture Giovani. A chapter from The Dig, first published in Granta Magazine, was shortlisted for the 2013 Sunday Times EFG Private Bank Short Story Award. The Dig, his most recent novel, won a 2014 Jerwood Fiction Uncovered Prize and the 2015 Wales Book of the Year Fiction Prize. That novel was also on the longlist for the 2014 Kirkus Prize in the US and the 2014 Warwick Prize for Writing.

Writing
In an interview with Cynan Jones about The Dig, the author spoke about "triggering reactions [in the reader], without being overtly shocking." He also explained his use of more poetic language for some characters over others to keep them apart or "mirror" an aspect of their character. In using "physical and natural allegories" to say things about people, the reader should "understand the reference instinctively." He mentioned writing like "Steinbeck, for example, with The Long Dry".

In another interview, Jones addressed the idea that there is "a natural allegory in the center of [his books] that really informs the human situation". He says to "trust the readers" so that you can do or say things that will "draw the reader's eye" and you don't have to "build narratives" that are more like "writing by numbers". When asked about "the saccharine and the violent" that a lot of literature avoids, Jones said that he trusts the reader to have an understanding of the "innate" nature of a situation and all he has to do is "write it down as clearly as I can, and without judgement", more like a witness than a voyeur.

In 2014, Jones made headlines for not punctuating most of the speech in his novel The Dig (and a few other short stories). His characters' speech and ideas had been delineated through quotation marks (inverted commas) until John Freeman, an editor at the magazine Granta, took a chance and removed the speech marks to be "more immediate, more with it". The author agreed on the impact of this unconventional device and finished the rest of the book this way, save for one conversation between the protagonist and his mother. In that passage, Jones used traditional speech marks "to create a sense of a more conventional, staid dialogue." Writers like Cormac McCarthy, James Joyce, and Samuel Beckett have experimented with this same lack of punctuation. By doing so, Jones went against a convention that has predominated since at least the late 18th century.

Bibliography
The Long Dry. Parthian Books. 2006, republished by Granta in 2014. 
Out onto the Water (unpublished in English). In Italian, Le Cose Che Non Vogliamo Più (Things We Don't Want Anymore). 2010.
Everything I Found on the Beach. Parthian Books. 2011, republished by Granta in 2014. 
Bird, Blood, Snow. Seren Books. 2012. 
The Dig. Granta Books. 2014. Coffee House Press US, 2015. 
Cove. Granta Books. Autumn 2016.
Stillicide. Catapult. November 2020.

References

External links
 Cynan Jones official website

21st-century British novelists
Welsh writers
Living people
1975 births
21st-century Welsh writers
Welsh novelists
People from Aberaeron